Alexis Iván Vázquez (born 23 September 1996) is an Argentine professional footballer who plays as a midfielder for Nueva Chicago.

Career
Vázquez started out in the system of Nueva Chicago. A 2–1 loss at home to Estudiantes on 4 September 2016 saw Vázquez make his bow in professional football, with the midfielder going on to make thirty-six appearances across the 2016–17 and 2017–18 seasons in Primera B Nacional; he also netted two goals in that period, against Los Andes and Deportivo Morón respectively.

Career statistics
.

References

External links

1996 births
Living people
Sportspeople from Buenos Aires Province
Argentine footballers
Association football midfielders
Primera Nacional players
Nueva Chicago footballers